The Connecticut Senate election, 2008 was held on November 4, 2008 to elect Senators to the Connecticut State Senate for the term which began in January 2009 and ended in January 2011. The election occurred on the same date as other federal and state elections, including the quadrennial U.S. presidential election.

The 2008 election saw the election or re-election of 24 Democrats and 12 Republicans to fill the Senate's 36 seats. The incumbent party in each district held onto control of their respective seats in the election, except for one seat which changed control from Republican to Democratic.

Results 
Results of the 2008 Connecticut Senate election. Party shading denotes winner of Senate seat.

Notes
TP Denotes that a minor, third party candidate (or candidates) also ran in this district's election.

RWI Denotes that a registered write-in candidate (or candidates) was also present in this district's election.

WF Denotes that this candidate also ran on the line of the Connecticut Working Families Party. The votes won by this candidate include both their Working Families and their party of affiliation figures combined.

I Denotes that this candidate also ran on the independent line. The votes won by this candidate include both their independent and their party of affiliation figures combined.

References 

2008 Connecticut elections
2008
C